The 1916 Kentucky Wildcats football team represented the University of Kentucky as a member of the Southern Intercollegiate Athletic Association (SIAA) during the 1916 college football season. Led by John J. Tigert in his second and final season as head coach, the Wildcats compiled an overall record of 4–1–2 with a mark 2–1–2 in SIAA play.

Stoll Field was dedicated for the game with rival Vanderbilt, the season's only loss. Vanderbilt's quarterback was third-team All-American Irby Curry. Vanderbilt coach Dan McGugin stated "If you would give me Doc Rodes, I would say he was a greater player than Curry." The season closed with an upset tie of conference champion and rival Tennessee; an account of which reads "Rodes and McIlvain, Kentucky's quarterback and fullback, played a magnificent game and had they received the proper support from their team, would have piled up a large score against Tennessee."

Schedule

References

Kentucky
Kentucky Wildcats football seasons
Kentucky Wildcats football